Puszczykowo is a town in Greater Poland Voivodeship, west-central Poland.

Puszczykowo may also refer to:
Puszczykowo, Grodzisk Wielkopolski County in Greater Poland Voivodeship
Puszczykowo, Lubusz Voivodeship (west Poland)